Azimullah Khan   (17 September 1830 — 18 March 1859), also known as Dewan Azimullah Khan, was initially appointed Secretary, and later Prime Minister (hence the prefix Dewan) to Maratha Peshwa Nana Saheb II.

Azimullah Khan was involved in the Indian Rebellion of 1857, primarily ideologically, influencing important nobles such as Shrimant Nana Saheb Peshwa II.

Origins
Azimullah was rescued as a starving Muslim boy from the famine of 1837-38 along with his mother when they were provided shelter at a mission in Kanpur. There he learnt English but also French, no mean achievement for an Indian in the 19th century.

After working as secretary to several British officers, he was taken into the service of the Maratha Peshwa Nana Saheb II, adopted son of the late Peshwa Baji Rao II (died 28 January 1851), as secretary and advisor.

The Maratha mission
While Nana Sahib had inherited Peshwa Baji Rao's property and title, the pension paid by the Company had terminated on the latter's death. Nana Sahib chose Azimullah to lead a delegation to England in 1853 to plead his case with the Board of Control and the British Government.

England
In England, Azimullah was taken under the wing of Lucie, Lady Duff-Gordon; an intellectual and translator whose husband was a civil servant, court functionary and the cousin of the then Prime Minister. This introduction probably came about through the philosopher John Stuart Mill, who was an official of the East India Company and had been a childhood friend of Lucie's. Azimullah lodged with the Duff Gordons at their home in Esher, and in Lucie's company may have met her friends Dickens, Carlyle, Meredith, Tennyson, Browning and Thackeray (though there is no direct evidence).

The mission to obtain resumption of the pension for Nana Sahib was unsuccessful and reportedly embittered Azimullah Khan.

Constantinople
On his way back, Azimullah's party stopped in Constantinople, which was then part of the Ottoman Empire. There he met with the Times correspondent William Howard Russell, who noted the young Muslim official's interest in the losses and setbacks suffered by the British Army. Azimullah is reported to have contacted Turkish and Russian spies.

Subversion and revolt
Although his mission had failed, he probably came back with a more dangerous idea, planting in the Nana Sahib's mind the seed of the Indian rebellion of 1857. (Azimullah also brought back a French printing press, which was used – by others – to print and distribute subversive literature against the British in India.)

Azimullah's own role in the great uprising that followed, the "Indian Mutiny", was political rather than military. Although he was chief advisor to the Nana Sahib, one of the principal leaders of the rebellion, he was a Muslim at a Hindu court, a talker, at a time when military men were needed, and without personal wealth, nobility, or a following of supporters, and so he soon became a marginal figure. He did however play a key role in the negotiations that terminated the Siege of Cawnpore. Representing Nana Sahib, Azimullah met with the British commander of the garrison Major-General Sir Hugh Wheeler and agreement was reached that the garrison and their families would be evacuated and taken by boat to safety in Allahabad. The following day he was seen among a group of Nana Sahib's advisers and officers who were present at the ambush and killing of most of the refugees as they boarded the waiting boats.

Death
Azimullah Khan probably died of a fever in late 1859, after the crushing of the rebellion, on the run from the British in the inhospitable border country of the Nepalese Terai. Other accounts have him dying of smallpox while attempting to reach Calcutta in disguise, or of escaping India and eventually being murdered in Constantinople. Azimullah Avenue, a road in Kanpur is named in his honour.

In popular culture
Azimullah Khan was portrayed by actor Shahbaz Khan in the 2005 movie Mangal Pandey: The Rising.

References

Further reading
 Lutfullah, Syed. Azimullah Khan Yusufzai: The man behind the war of independence 1857. Karachi: Mohamedali Educational Society, second edition, 1970.
 Ward, Andrew. Our Bones Are Scattered: The Cawnpore Massacres and The Indian Mutiny of 1857. New York: Henry Holt, 1996.
  Fisher, Michael H. Indian Political Representations in Britain during the Transition to Colonialism. Cambridge: Cambridge University Press, 2004.
 Fisher, Michael H. Counterflows to Colonialism: Visitors and Settlers from India in Britain, c. 1600–1857. Delhi: Permanent Black, 2004.
 Jarman, Francis. "Azimullah Khan - A Reappraisal of One of the Major Figures of the Revolt of 1857". In: South Asia: Journal of South Asian Studies, vol. XXXI, no. 3, December 2008, pp. 419–49.
 Swatantryaveer Sawarkar, Marathi: 1857 che Swatantrya Samar

Revolutionaries of the Indian Rebellion of 1857
1830 births
1859 deaths
People from Kanpur
Indian Muslims
Indian revolutionaries
Indian independence activists from Uttar Pradesh